Notopalaeognathae is a clade that contains the order Rheiformes (rheas), the clade Novaeratitae (birds such as the kiwis and the emus), the order Tinamiformes (tinamous) and the extinct order Dinornithiformes (the moas). The exact relationships of this group have only recently been understood, with tinamous and the moas sharing a common ancestor and the kiwis being more closely related to emus and cassowaries. The extinct elephant birds of Madagascar have recently been identified as closest relative to the kiwis. The rheas are either the basal most branch of notopalaeognaths as they are the sister group to Novaeratitae. The sister group to Notopalaeognathae is Struthionidae (the ostrich family).

References

 
Paleognathae
Extant Aptian first appearances